Darrius L. Blevins (born April 21, 1976) is a former American football wide receiver and return specialist who played for the St. Louis Rams of the National Football League (NFL). He was signed by the Rams as an undrafted free agent in 1999. He played college football at Memphis.

Early life and college
Darrius Blevins was born on April 21, 1976 in Morristown, Tennessee. He played high school football at Morristown-Hamblen High School West from 1991 to 1994. He attended the University of Memphis and played for the Memphis Tigers from 1994 to 1998. He graduated with a bachelor's degree.

Professional career
Blevins was signed by the St. Louis Rams in 1999 as an undrafted free agent. He didn't appear in any games for 1999 season, however the Rams won Super Bowl XXXIV by beating the Tennessee Titans 23-16.

Blevins was promoted to the active roster for the 2000 season and appeared in five games. He played in weeks 12-16 primarily as a kick returner, returning nine kicks for 173 yards and no touchdowns. He also logged a single tackle on special teams. The Rams went 10-6 and made the playoffs, losing to the New Orleans Saints 31-28 in the Wild Card round.

Prior to the 2001 season, Blevins was injured and placed on injury reserve. He retired soon after.

See also
2000 St. Louis Rams season

References

1976 births
American football wide receivers
American football return specialists
Memphis Tigers football players
St. Louis Rams players
Living people
People from Morristown, Tennessee
Players of American football from Tennessee